The 2010–11 Ohio Bobcats women's basketball team represented Ohio University during the 2010–11 NCAA Division I women's basketball season. The Bobcats, led by third year head coach Semeka Randall, played their home games at the Convocation Center in Athens, Ohio as a member of the Mid-American Conference. They finished the season 9–22 and 4–12 in MAC play.

Preseason
The preseason poll and league awards were announced by the league office on October 27, 2010. Ohio was picked fifth in the MAC East.

Preseason women's basketball poll
(First place votes in parenthesis)

East Division
 
 
 
 
 Ohio

West Division
 Toledo

Tournament champs
Bowling Green

Schedule

|-
!colspan=9 style=| Non-conference regular season

|-

|-

|-
!colspan=9 style=| MAC regular season

|-
!colspan=9 style=| MAC Tournament

|-

Awards and honors

All-MAC Awards

References

Ohio
Ohio Bobcats women's basketball seasons
Ohio Bobcats women's basketball
Ohio Bobcats women's basketball